H Block is an album recorded by various Irish folk artists, and produced by Christy Moore in 1978.

The album's title refers to the "H blocks" at Maze Prison (also known as "Long Kesh") in Northern Ireland, where Irish republican prisoners were held during the Troubles. The subject matter of several of these songs (particularly Moore's "90 Miles From Dublin") specifically centers on the period of the blanket and dirty protests at Maze and at Armagh Women's Prison. The launch of the album was raided by the Special Detective Unit ("Special Branch") of the Republic of Ireland.

Track listing
 "Rights of Man" (Traditional) - Matt Molloy
 "Guest of the Queen" (Brian Ua Baoill) -  Stephen Ray
 "On The Blanket" (Mick Hanly) - Mick Hanly
 "H. Block Song" (Francie Brolly) - Francie Brolly
 "Repeal the Union" (Traditional) - Matt Molloy
 "Bright Star" - Stephen Ray
 "Patrick's Arrival"
 "Taimse I Mo Chodladh" (Traditional) - Dan Dowd
 "90 Miles from Dublin" (Christy Moore) - Christy Moore
 "A Retort" - Stephen Ray
 "Lucy Campbell/Patsy Tuohy" (Traditional) -  Noel Hill and Tony Linnane

Personnel
 Christy Moore – vocals, guitar, bouzouki, bodhrán
Declan Sinnott - guitar
Dónal Lunny - bouzouki, guitar
Dan O'Dowd - uilleann pipes on "Taimse I Mo Chodladh"
Noel Hill - concertina on "Lucy Campbell/Patsy Tuohy"
Tony Linnane - fiddle on "Lucy Campbell/Patsy Tuohy"
Matt Molloy - flute on "Rights of Man" and "Repeal the Union"

References

External links
Christy Moore's description from his official website
Album information

Christy Moore albums
1978 albums
Political music albums